Kamiterazu Dam  is a gravity dam located in Ishikawa Prefecture in Japan. The dam is used for power production. The catchment area of the dam is 71 km2. The dam can store 129 thousand cubic meters of water. The construction of the dam was started on 1961 and completed in 1965.

See also
List of dams in Japan

References

Dams in Ishikawa Prefecture